is a Japanese actress. She is represented by Grick.

Filmography

Films

TV dramas

TV series

Anime

Direct-to-video

Stage

Advertisements

Magazines

Apps

References

External links
 
 （2014年5月28日 - ）
 （2016年6月13日 - ）

1995 births
Living people
People from Okinawa Prefecture
21st-century Japanese actresses
Ryukyuan people